Mayor of Syracuse may refer to the mayor of Syracuse, New York, or the mayor of Syracuse, Sicily:
 List of mayors of Syracuse, New York
 List of mayors of Syracuse, Sicily